Atractaspis engdahli, also known commonly as Engdahl's burrowing asp, Engdahl's burrowing viper, and the mole viper, is a species of venomous snake in the family Atractaspididae. The species is endemic to Africa.

Etymology
The specific name, engdahli, is in honor of Swedish missionary Theodor Engdahl, who collected the holotype.

Geographic range
A. engdahli is found in north-eastern Kenya and in Somalia.

Habitat

Behaviour
A. engdahli is terrestrial and nocturnal. It is often found in termite nests and in holes in the ground.

Reproduction
A. engdahli is oviparous.

References

Further reading
Lanza B (1990). "Amphibians and reptiles of the Somali Democratic Republic: checklist and biogeography". Biogeographia 14: 407–465.
Lönnberg E, Andersson LG (1913). "On a collection of reptiles from Kismayu". Arkiv för Zoologi, Uppsala 8: 1–6. (Atractaspis engdahli, new species, pp. 5–6, Figure 1, three views of head).
Spawls S, Howell K, Drewes R, Ashe J (2004). A Field Guide to the Reptiles of East Africa. London: A & C Black Publisher Ltd. 543 pp. .
Spawls S, Howell K, Hinkel H, Menegon M (2018). Field Guide to East African Reptiles, Second Edition. London: Bloomsbury Natural History. 624 pp. . (Atractaspis engdahli, p. 474).

Atractaspididae
Taxa named by Einar Lönnberg
Taxa named by Lars Gabriel Andersson
Reptiles described in 1913